KXNT (840 kHz) is a commercial AM radio station licensed to North Las Vegas, Nevada, United States. It is owned and operated by Audacy, Inc. and carries a talk radio format.  The radio studios are located in the unincorporated Clark County area of Spring Valley, while KXNT's transmitter is located on U.S. Route 93 at Great Valley Parkway in North Las Vegas.

KXNT is a Class B station operating on a clear channel frequency. WHAS in Louisville, Kentucky is the dominant Class A station on 840 AM, so KXNT must reduce its power at night to avoid interfering with WHAS's signal.  KXNT operates at 50,000 watts by day and 25,000 watts at night.  KXNT has been granted an FCC construction permit to move to the KXST transmitter site and decrease night power to 10,000 watts.

KXNT is licensed to broadcast in the HD radio format, but is not currently broadcasting in HD. KXNT is Southern Nevada's primary entry point station for the Emergency Alert System.

Programming
KXNT airs mostly nationally syndicated talk shows.  A local hour is hosted weekdays by Alan Stock at 8 a.m.  The rest of the weekday schedule includes This Morning, America's First News with Gordon Deal; Glenn Beck; Ben Shapiro; Dana Loesch; Joe Pags; Dave Ramsey and Coast to Coast AM with George Noory.

Weekends feature shows on money, politics, health, law, real estate, home repair and computers. Syndicated hosts include Kim Komando; Ben Ferguson; Larry Elder and Ric Edelman. Some hours feature paid brokered programming.

KXNT carries hourly reports CBS News Radio and financial reports from Bloomberg Radio. It has a local news alliance with KLAS-TV, the CBS Network affiliate in Las Vegas.

History

KXNT signed on the air in 1986 with the call letters KVEG, airing a talk and middle of the road music format. It was owned by the Roberts Communications Corp.

KVEG had several noted hosts including Sam Greenfield, Dominick Brascia, Lou Epton, Irwin Schiff and the syndicated Tom Leykis. In 1997, KVEG changed its call letters to KXNT with the "NT" standing for "News/Talk".  The station moved to a more traditional talk radio line up, airing Rush Limbaugh and Coast to Coast AM previously heard on rival station KDWN. Other shows included Dr. Laura and Bill Handel.

In 1998, Infinity Broadcasting acquired KXNT.  In December 2005, Infinity was renamed CBS Radio.  On February 2, 2017, CBS Radio announced it would merge with Entercom. The merger was approved on November 9, 2017, and was consummated on November 17.

Former FM simulcast
Between August 16, 2010 and September 4, 2015, programming on KXNT had been simulcast on sister FM station KXNT-FM (100.5 FM), to give listeners who prefer FM that option.  That station now airs a rhythmic hot adult contemporary format, under the call sign KXQQ-FM.

Former hosts
 Heidi Harris
 Kerri Kasem

References

External links

XNT
News and talk radio stations in the United States
XNT
Radio stations established in 1986
1986 establishments in Nevada
Audacy, Inc. radio stations